Hasili (12 March 1991 – 23 March 2018) was a French Thoroughbred racehorse who was an outstanding broodmare. A Khalid Abdullah hombred at his Juddmonte Farms, she was out of the mare Kerali and sired by Kahyasi, winner of the 1988 Irish and Epsom Derbys. Hasili won the Prix des Sablonnets at Nantes at age two and was placed in two Listed races at three.

Retired to broodmare duty, Hasili produced Cacique, Champs Elysees, Banks Hill, Intercontinental, and Heat Haze who together made her the first Northern Hemisphere broodmare to produce five Group/Grade I winners, all of which are racing millionaires.

Hasili was also the dam of Dansili, sire of Rail Link who won the 2006 Prix de l'Arc de Triomphe, and of  Deluxe, a 2007 filly by Storm Cat, and a 2008 filly by Empire Maker.

Hasili died at Juddmonte Farms's Banstead Manor Stud at Newmarket, England on 23 March 2018.

Pedigree

References

 Hasili's pedigree and partial racing stats
 Hasili profile at Juddmonte.com
 Hasili, dam of 5 Grade 1 winners and 3 champions, dies at 27

1991 racehorse births
2018 racehorse deaths
Racehorses bred in Ireland
Racehorses trained in France
Thoroughbred family 11
Blue Hen Broodmare